Lars Jörgen Pålsson Syll (born November 5, 1957) is a Swedish economist who is a Professor of Social Studies and Associate professor of Economic History at Malmö University College.
Pålsson Syll has been a prominent contributor to the economic debate in Sweden over the global financial crisis that began in 2008.

Biography
Lars Jörgen Pålsson Syll (born in 1957) received a PhD in economic history in 1991 and a PhD in economics in 1997, both at Lund University. In 1995 he was appointed associate professor in economic history at Malmö University College. In 2004 he was appointed a professor of social studies at Malmö University College. He researches and teaches the history of economic theory and methodology. Other research areas include theories of distributive justice and critical realist social science. He also studied under Hyman Minsky as a young research stipendiate in the U.S. at the beginning of the 1980s. Lars Pålsson Syll has written several books and many articles in scientific journals.

Views

General
Pålsson Syll believes in a Post-Keynesian and institutional approach  to the study of the economy. This theory, notably advanced by Douglass North and Robert Fogel, emphasizes the importance of efficient institutions in achieving economic growth. He has described both Joseph Schumpeter and John Kenneth Galbraith as "quasi-institutionalists", in the meaning they were "heterodox-economists", influenced by other schools of thought. He is a critical realist and an outspoken opponent of all kinds of social constructivism and postmodern relativism. He has been strongly influenced by John Maynard Keynes. In 2011 he was a strong supporter of Paul Romer to be awarded the Nobel prize for economics for his work on how people really behave in the market.

Pålsson Syll is a critic of neoliberalism and market fundamentalism, which he attacked in his 2001 book "The dismal science: economics and the neoliberalism crisis". He traces today's problems to the mid-1970s, when, according to Syll, economists began to dominate the public welfare discourse, using neo-classical microeconomic arguments that the public sector should be run in the same way as the private sector. Syll claims that these economists denied that there was any real difference between manufacturing and social services, and felt the recipients of these services should be treated as informed customers. They felt that tax-funded welfare institutions were disincentives to the entrepreneurship that promoted growth. However, Pålsson Syll has argued that greater income equality may in fact foster growth, since a stronger safety net allows individuals to take greater risks. He also thinks that excessive wealth of a few individuals can cause a strain on democracy.

Pålsson Syll's theories have been criticized by right-wing economists such as Henrik Jordahl, Andreas Bergh and author Johan Norberg.

Global financial crisis
Talking of the financial crisis of 2007–2008, Pålsson Syll said capitalism has an inherent tendency to periodically create speculative bubbles in different asset markets. He blames the massive deregulation of the financial markets in the 1980s for both the 1990s crisis and the more recent crisis that began in 2008, and has called for a return to tighter regulation and greater transparency. He sees low interest rates as a risk to the economy. They hurt those dependent on investment income. More important, the central bank loses their main economic stimulation tool. And there is a risk of deflation, which can cause long-term economic contraction. In 2009 he proposed the radical solution of a lottery each year through which the central bank would take back all bank notes with a given final digit in their serial number. This would in effect be a negative interest rate of 10%, reducing the value of money and encouraging consumption, which would kick-start the economy. Although not in favor of protectionism, he has said that if the United States and other European Union countries begin introducing protectionist measures Sweden may be forced to do so too, in a variant of the prisoner's dilemma.

Bibliography 

 
 
 
 
 
 
 Amartya Sen on Neo-Liberalism (2004), The History of Economic Theories (in Swedish, fourth ed 2007),

References

Sources

External links 
 
 

Post-Keynesian economists
Swedish economists
Macroeconomists
Keynesians
Institutional economists
Historians of economic thought
Economic historians
Living people
1957 births
Academic staff of Malmö University